Gondwana Game Reserve is a game reserve situated near the town of Mossel Bay in the Western Cape of South Africa, a malaria-free area.

History
Gondwana is the first authentic free-roaming Big Five Reserve in the Western Cape, situated on 11 000 ha of fynbos and proteas. Owners, Mark and Wendy Rutherfoord, started Gondwana six years ago, transforming a series of cattle and sheep farms into an 11,000-hectare safari destination. The terrain, restored to its natural beauty, consists of open grassland, undulating valleys, indigenous fynbos and now herds of wildlife. Gondwana has re-introduced endangered species like the Cape mountain zebra and south-central black rhinoceros and has a high diversity of antelope species such as eland, gemsbok, red hartebeest, bontebok, and springbok.

Fauna

Gondwana has also reintroduced the South African cheetahs onto the reserve. They were sourced from an expansive reserve in the Karoo where they were free roaming and born in the wild. This is the result of Gondwana's continued conservation efforts to utilize its habitat to help sustain endangered species, and the cheetah introduction contributes to increasing their genetic diversity in South Africa. Gondwana plays home to not only the free roaming Big 5 but also to the black rhino, over 10 varieties of antelope, more than the Kruger National Park, and hundreds of head of general game.

See also
Game reserve

External links
 Gondwana Game Reserve Website
 Gondwana Game Reserve on Pam Golding Properties
 Cape Town Magazine on Gondwana

Notes

Protected areas of the Western Cape